This is a list of episodes from the satirical sport-based panel game They Think It's All Over.

From series 1 until series 5 the show was chaired by Nick Hancock, with team captains David Gower (and regular panellist Lee Hurst) and Gary Lineker (and regular panellist Rory McGrath) and a guest on each team. For series 6 and 7, Lee Hurst's position was switched with various celebrity guests such as Phill Jupitus and Alan Davies. From series 8 onwards Jonathan Ross replaced Lee Hurst permanently. From series 16 onwards David Gower and Gary Lineker were replaced as team captains by Phil Tufnell and David Seaman. From series 18, Ian Wright replaced David Seaman as captain. From series 19, Lee Mack became the new host and Boris Becker replaced Phil Tufnell as team captain, while Jonathan Ross was replaced by Sean Lock as the regular panellist on Boris' team for the 2006 specials.

The show was cancelled following series 19, although there were two specials in the summer of 2006 and a special episode aired live as part of 24 Hour Panel People in 2011, for which Hancock, Tufnell and Hurst returned (in spite of the fact that Tufnell and Hurst had been regulars at different points in the show).

Episode list
Over the 19 series, 154 episodes were broadcast. There have also been two exclusive-to-video editions and a live webcast version for Comic Relief.

The coloured backgrounds denote the result of each of the shows:
 – indicates David (Gower)'s/Phil's/Boris' team won
 – indicates Gary's/David (Seaman)'s/Ian's team won
 – indicates the game ended in a draw

Series 1

Series 2

Series 3

No Holds Barred

Series 4

Full Throttle

Series 5

Series 6

Series 7

Series 8

Series 9

Series 10

Series 11

Series 12

Series 13

Series 14

Series 15

Series 16

Series 17

Series 18

Series 19

2006 specials

Comic Relief Special

Scores

Footnotes

External links

Lists of British comedy television series episodes
Lists of British non-fiction television series episodes